Everything at Once is the eighth studio album by the Scottish band Travis, the album was released on 29 April 2016. The band also made a movie for the album, which was included as a DVD in the deluxe version of the album. The movie premiered on 17 March 2016 at The Alamo Drafthouse Cinema as part of South by Southwest. The album has received mixed to positive reviews from music critics.

Track listing

Charts

References

2016 albums
Travis (band) albums